Tameka Dianne Cottle Harris (born July 14, 1975), known professionally by her nickname Tiny, is an American singer-songwriter. She rose to fame in the 1990s as a member of the multi-platinum R&B vocal group Xscape. She received a Grammy Award for her writing contributions on the TLC hit "No Scrubs". Cottle is also known for her marriage to T.I. She acquired the nickname "Tiny" due to her small stature of 4'11".

Early life
Cottle was born in College Park, Georgia, to a white mother, Dianne Cottle (b. 1945) and an African-American father, Charles "Speedy" Pope (1936–2013). Cottle's father and her uncle, Joseph Pope (1933–1996), formed the R&B group The Tams.

Career

Cottle joined the R&B quartet Xscape in 1992 while attending Tri-Cities Performing Arts High School. Xscape was discovered by producer Jermaine Dupri while singing at his birthday celebration in Atlanta, Georgia. Dupri immediately signed the group to his then new record label, So So Def Recordings.

As a member of the group, Cottle has contributed to three of the band's platinum albums: Hummin' Comin' at 'Cha, Off the Hook, and Traces of My Lipstick. As a member of Xscape, she has received two Soul Train Music Awards for Best New R&B Artist and Best R&B Album and the A-Town Music Award for Best Duo/Group. Cottle sang lead vocals on six of Xscape's hit singles: "Understanding", "Do You Want To?", "All I Need", "Love's a Funny Thing", "My Little Secret", and "Am I Dreamin. She has also recorded on soundtracks for Soul Food, Panther, Bad Boys, and Love Jones. In 1998, after the release of Xscape's third album, Traces of My Lipstick, the band parted ways.

In 2000, Cottle and fellow former Xscape group member Kandi Burruss were honored with a Grammy Award for Best R&B Song for penning TLC's hit single "No Scrubs". Cottle's other accomplishments include an American Society of Composers, Authors and Publishers award in the R&B and Pop Music categories for "No Scrubs", as well as the ASCAP Rap Award for her work on the Sporty Thievz track "No Pigeons". Cottle has also worked with T.I., 8Ball & MJG, Lil' Kim and Bow Wow.

After a five-year hiatus, Cottle reunited with sisters LaTocha and Tamika Scott and added a new member, Kiesha Miles, to release a Xscape album entitled Unchained and released the single "What's Up" in 2005.

Cottle is involved in a project with Kiesha Miles called the OMG Girlz. Cottle's daughter, Zonnique, is a part of the musical trio. She appeared in her husband's video for "Hello", along with their family and the OMG Girlz.

In June 2009, Cottle's reality series, Tiny and Toya, made its debut on BET.

On July 22, 2014, Tameka returned to the music industry under her new label Pretty Hustle, with her first solo single "What The Fuck You Gon Do?". Within a few hours of "WTFYGD" being released it reached the number 5 spot on the iTunes R&B/Soul charts, and less than 24 hours after release it became the number one song on the charts for the genre.

She and bandmate Kandi Burruss, also have writing credits on the song Shape of You by Ed Sheeran.

In 2018, Tiny Harris took a break from her XSCAP3 EP Promo to spend some quality time with her one-year-old daughter Heiress.

Personal life
In 2001, Cottle began dating rapper T.I. Cottle and T.I. married on July 30, 2010 in Miami Beach, Florida. They have two sons together: King Harris (born August 25, 2004), Major Philant Harris (born May 16, 2008) and a daughter, Heiress Diana Harris (born March 2016). Their first daughter was stillborn in 2007, six months into a complicated pregnancy. Cottle also has an older daughter named Zonnique from her previous relationship with Zonnie "Zeboe" Pullins. Through her marriage to T.I., Cottle has three stepchildren.

In December 2011, T.I. & Tiny: The Family Hustle premiered on VH1. The series chronicles the lives of Cottle and T.I. plus their family.

Cottle's father, Charles Pope, died on July 11, 2013, at the age of 76 after a long battle with Alzheimer's disease.

Tiny and Shekinah's Weave Trip premiered on VH1 on October 13, 2014. The series chronicles Cottle and her best friend Shekinah Anderson in a mobile hair salon across the country.

In March 2016, the couple had a daughter.  In December 2016, Cottle filed for divorce from T.I. after six years of marriage. However, the couple worked on healing their marriage in 2017 after Tiny spent time with her group Xscape, and Tiny dropped the divorce files stating: "The divorce is off."

In 2017, it was announced she would own the Atlanta Heirs basketball team under the newly developed Global Mixed Gender Basketball league, which was founded by rapper Master P. Her team would be a part of its inaugural debut on September 23, 2017 in a neutral match at the Cox Pavilion in Las Vegas, Nevada against Master P's own squad, the New Orleans Gators.

Legal issues
On September 1, 2010, Cottle and T.I. were arrested following a motor vehicle stop in Los Angeles. The police reported that an odor of burnt marijuana was coming from the vehicle and the couple were found to be in possession of a controlled substance, ecstasy. They posted $10,000 bail.

In 2021, Cottle and her husband T.I. were facing numerous sexual assault allegations. More than 30 women contacted Attorney Tyrone A. Blackburn accusing Tameka "Tiny" Harris, her husband T.I., and their associates of "forced drugging, kidnapping, rape, and intimidation" in at least two states, including California and Georgia. Blackburn sent letters to the state attorney general of California and Georgia asking them to open an investigation. The women allege that "prior to or upon immediately entering T&T's home, hotel, or tour bus [they] were coerced by Tiny to ingest drugs or [were] unknowingly administered drugs to impair the victims' ability to consent to subsequent vile sexual acts."

References

External links

 

1975 births
Living people
African-American women singer-songwriters
T.I.
American soul musicians
Grammy Award winners
Musicians from Atlanta
Participants in American reality television series
American contemporary R&B singers
21st-century American women singers
21st-century American singers
Singer-songwriters from Georgia (U.S. state)